This is a list of diplomatic missions in the Republic of the Congo, also known as Congo-Brazzaville.  At present, the capital city of Brazzaville hosts 31 embassies. Several other countries accredit ambassadors from other capitals.

Diplomatic missions in Brazzaville

Embassies

Other missions/delegations
 (Delegation)

Consular missions

Dolisie 
 (Consulate-General)

Ouesso 
  (Consulate)

Pointe-Noire 
 (Consulate-General)
 (Consulate-General)
 (Consulate-General)

Non-resident embassies accredited to Congo-Brazzaville 

Resident in Abuja, Nigeria:

Resident in Kinshasa, Congo-Kinshasa:

Resident in Luanda, Angola:

 

 

Resident in other cities:

 (Addis Ababa)
 (Paris)
 (Cotonou)
 (Yaoundé)
 (Yaoundé)
 (Libreville)
 (Windhoek)
 (Valletta)
 (Dar es Salaam)
 (Libreville)
 (Libreville)
 (Nairobi)

See also 
 Foreign relations of the Republic of the Congo

References

External links
 Official Site of the Republic of the Congo (in French)

 
Congo-Brazzaville
Diplomatic missions